Polish Home Hall is a historic building located in the waterfront industrial/commercial/residential and heavily ethnic community of Curtis Bay in southern Baltimore, Maryland, (United States). Built on the southwest corner of Fairhaven Avenue (formerly known as Fairview Avenue before mid-1920s) and Filbert Street near the top of the commanding heights overlooking to the east the sloping streets of the neighborhood of Curtis Bay, about four city blocks wide (east to west) and 15 blocks length (north to south).

Further east beyond the residential area is a wide belt of a waterfront industrial zone with numerous railroad tracks / sidings and yard plus piers and industrial buildings/warehouses and one of the longest manufacturing assembly plant structures on East Coast of the United States, built in 1887 and massively expanded in 1916 for a railroad  foundry associated with the infamous Pullman Company, headquartered in Chicago, Illinois and its "company town" on the southside of the second largest city in America of Pullman, Illinois. Begun by famous inventor and industrialist George Pullman (1831–1897), for building railway passenger cars, overnight sleeping cars, dining and café cars, etc., plus storage/shipping box cars, coal and iron ore cars, cabooses and other various types of rolling stock and their constituent parts required like steel wheels, axles, brake systems, wheel assemblies that were required and much of that industrial hardware for transportation were manufactured by the South Baltimore  foundry company along what was named Curtis Avenue, just west of the waterfront piers, cranes and loading machines with conveyor belts alongside the interspaced rail tracks in Curtis Bay due to its recent new convenient extensions of lines of trackage to the south of old Baltimore City to the southwest areas alongside the outer Baltimore Harbor shorelines of the lower main stem of the Patapsco River and its cove (water body) of Curtis Bay on the southwest shores and its tributary streams of Curtis Creek, Marley Creek and Furnace Branch creek in adjacent rural northern Anne Arundel County.

The new rail lines, yards, switching stations and bridges were installed in the early 1890s by the regional dominant line of the Baltimore and Ohio Railroad, first rail passenger and freight line in the nation, begin in 1827–1828, over six decades before and now dominated the industry of the country.

This was the inspiring view from the second story assembly hall of the new town hall of Curtis Bay overlooking the. burgeoning busy harbor and railroads documented in a two-foot long panoramic fold-out printed photograph in a descriptive booklet pamphlet on the attributes for residences and industrial possibilities published in 1917 by Curtis Bay Terraces, Inc., a land development subsidiary of the longtime landowners, the South Baltimore Harbor and Improvement Company, seeking to add additional houses on the streets it had laid out on the higher hills to the west overlooking the original three-block wide street grid plat of the late 1880s of the predecessor developers known as the Patapsco Land Company of Baltimore City. This firm had been reorganized in 1874 from the earlier Patapsco Company of the 1850s pre-American Civil War developers of local Anne Arundel farmers and land owners combined with city financiers, businessmen, and a few far-seeing politicians who established and laid out the nearby town of Brooklyn, along the north-south road, (one of two parallel Baltimore-Annapolis thoroughfares of dirt/gravel) from the state capital and county seat of Annapolis, 20 miles south, towards Baltimore to the north.

The new Brooklyn town, named after the similarly sited predecessor city of Brooklyn, New York, founded in the 17th century, it too named for an earlier Dutch city in the Netherlands in Europe.

The Maryland Brooklyn was two miles to the northwest from the cove / river inlet Curtis Bay in 1853, 34 years earlier along the south and east shores of the Ferry Branch (now Middle Branch) of the Patapsco River, on the northern reaches of Anne Arundel County, second oldest in the state and also directly south of the city established and laid out in 1729, and the county seat for then surrounding Baltimore County created in 1659.

The new village of Brooklyn was connected by a mile-long wooden trestle span, the Light Street Bridge (or also known as the Long Bridge or Brooklyn Bridge). Constructed in 1856, three years after the town and replaced the earlier ferry since colonial times, which unfortunately charged tolls considered too high and expensive, and also provided easy road access to Curtis Bay and by 1895, an electric streetcar service.

The Curtis Bay Town Hall of 1905/1909 (and later Polish Home Hall by 1925) is a large two-story (with a third story attic under a sloping shingle roof), structure of masonry / dark red brick with stone trim, of vernacular Beaux-Arts architectural style building bearing classical features and symmetry.  It was constructed about 1905 as the town hall, real estate/developers offices, volunteer fire company station, and a meeting/assembly hall on the large second floor for the small community of Curtis Bay within the southern limits of the City of Baltimore, to which it was absorbed in the third major annexation in municipal history in January 1919, from adjoining northern Anne Arundel County as the city also expanded in the other three directions – north, east and west into surrounding Baltimore County also.

In 1925, the United Polish Societies purchased the building from the developing firm of the South Baltimore Harbor and Improvement Company and renamed it Polish Home Hall and it became central to the increasing Polish immigrant influx experience in Curtis Bay which had been flooding in along with large numbers of other Eastern European nationalities coming in from overseas through the Locust Point immigration station and piers for the B.&O. Railroad and their connections with the North German Lloyd shipping line in Bremen and Hamburg, the second largest immigration station in the United States, next to New York Citys Ellis Island, since the early 1900s, This added tremendously to the original heavily Anglo-English and German residents originally predominating since the town's founding in the late 1880s.  Curtis Bay underwent a radical transformation and evolved and grew quite differently from more "Americanized" residential suburb of nearby Brooklyn, with much less industrial and port / railroad development. The newly acquired Polish Home Hall soon functioned as a social, educational, and political center for Curtis Bay's growing expanding Polish community (along with several other East European peoples attracted to the same community of neighboring Slavic immigrants, with the second largest numbers of Poles and others in a Baltimore neighborhood besides near Fells Point and adjacent Canton or Highlandtown communities, further northeast across the Patapsco River / Baltimore Harbor in the southeast part of the city, which remained heavily ethnic Polish into the 1970s.

After over a century of little appreciation and recognition, the Polish Home Hall in Curtis Bay was listed on the National Register of Historic Places, maintained by the National Park Service of the U.S. Department of the Interior in 2007.

References

External links 
  at Maryland Historical Trust

Beaux-Arts architecture in Maryland
Government buildings completed in 1905
Curtis Bay, Baltimore
Polish-American culture in Baltimore
Polish-American organizations
Clubhouses on the National Register of Historic Places in Baltimore
1905 establishments in Maryland